Rickie is a male or female given name.

People
 Rickie D. Moore, noted theologian within the Pentecostal movement
 Rickie Fowler, American professional golfer
 Rickie Harris,  American football defensive back
 Rickie Haywood Williams, radio DJ and television presenter
 Rickie Lambert, English professional footballer
 Rickie Lee Jones, American vocalist, musician, songwriter, and producer
 Rickie Solinger, independent historian, curator, and lecturer
 Rickie Weeks Jr., American professional baseball left fielder
 Rickie Winslow, retired American professional basketball player

See also
 Ricky (disambiguation)
 Rikki